"Everything I Own" is a song written by American singer-songwriter David Gates. It was originally recorded by Gates's soft rock band Bread for their 1972 album Baby I'm-a Want You. The original reached No. 5 on the American Billboard Hot 100. Billboard ranked it as the No. 52 song for 1972. "Everything I Own" also reached No. 5 in Canada and No. 1 in the Philippines.

Jamaican artist Ken Boothe's reggae version of the song was No. 1 in the UK Singles chart in 1974. A version by Boy George reached No. 1 in the charts in the UK, Canada, Ireland and Norway in 1987, Boy George's first hit and only UK No. 1 as a solo artist.

Composition
Although initial listeners may have interpreted it as a song about a broken relationship, David Gates revealed that it was written in memory of his father who died in 1963 before he achieved his success with Bread. According to the book 1000 UK No. 1 Hits by Jon Kutner and Spencer Leigh, at his father's funeral, a friend took David Gates aside and said, "Your dad was so proud of what you were doing." David agreed, "My success would have been so special to him as he was my greatest influence. So I decided to write and record 'Everything I Own' about him. If you listen to the words, 'You sheltered me from harm, kept me warm, you gave my life to me, set me free', it says it all." As for the title, Gates said that he once sent his mother an orchid for her birthday at a time when he could barely afford it: "She was so touched – my dad wrote to tell me I could have had "anything she owned" in return." Typically Gates wrote the lyrics after the music. Although the lyrics were written so it could be interpreted as a love song, Gates said: "When I played it for my wife, she knew right away that it was about my father. She cried."

Covers
The single has been recorded by Shirley Bassey, The Connells, Jack Jones, Zdravko Čolić, Ken Boothe, Olivia Newton-John, Georgie Fame, Boy George, William Tarmey, *NSYNC, Jude, Rod Stewart, Rebeca Monroy, Crystal Gayle, Nicole Scherzinger, Russ Willoughby, Chrissie Hynde, Felix Serrat, Greg London, Edison Lighthouse, Marc Engelhard, Hernaldo Zuniga, Aiza Seguerra, Vanessa Hudgens and Boyzone. The song was frequently interpreted as a romantic one, but Gates wrote it as a tribute to his late father.

Charts

Weekly charts

Year-end charts

Ken Boothe version

Jamaican artist Ken Boothe's reggae version of the song "Everything I Own" in 1974 was featured on his Trojan Records album release of the same name. Boothe first heard Andy Williams' version of the song in Canada, and included it in his album as he needed additional material. He recorded the song at the Federal studios in Kingston, Jamaica, and it reached No. 1 in that country on release. The recording was then picked by Trojan Records for release in the United Kingdom, where it reached No. 1 in the Singles charts on October 26, 1974, staying at the top for three weeks.  Although the song was a major success, with Trojan going bankrupt in 1975, Boothe did not receive royalties.

Boothe's version employs the lyric "I would give anything I own".

Personnel 
Source: 
 Ken Boothe – vocals
 Willie Lindo – guitar
 Lloyd Parks – bass
 Paul Douglas a.k.a. Paul Williams – drums
 Federal Soul Givers
 Lloyd Charmers – producer, organ, piano, percussion
 Buddy Davidson & George Raymond – mixing engineers

Boy George version

The version by British singer and songwriter Boy George reached No. 1 on the UK Singles Chart for two weeks in March 1987, becoming his first hit and only UK No. 1 as a solo artist. It was also his first solo single after a departure from his band, Culture Club. Owing more to the Ken Boothe version, the sweet reggae style was reminiscent of his earlier debut hit with Culture Club, "Do You Really Want to Hurt Me?". Coming at the time of his arrest for possession of heroin, it provided a major boost to his career. Other than the UK, it was a No. 1 in many countries (including Canada, Ireland, Italy, Norway and South Africa) and top 10 in many markets too. The track was recorded during the "Sold" sessions at Air Studios Montserrat and produced by Stewart Levine. The musicians were Ian Maidman (later aka Jennifer Maidman) bass and guitar, Vic Martin keyboards, Glen Nightingale guitar, Richie Stevens drums, and Paul 'Wix' Wickens keyboards .

Boy George played this song many times in his live shows. He re-recorded the track in an acoustic style (named the Hippy Trippy Mix) and it was released on the American CD single of "Everything I Own", a re-release from 1993. It was also remixed in a dub version for the Culture Club 2002 box set.

Critical reception
William Ruhlmann from AllMusic stated in his review of Sold, "But it's still that bouncy, vulnerable voice, notably on the reggae-tinged hit "Everything I Own", that remains his trademark." On the 1993 version, Larry Flick from Billboard commented, "Refurbished for George's new "At Worst, The Best Of" compilation, oh-so charming track should meet with greater approval this time around—thanks to George's revived strength at radio and radio's increasing penchant for reggaevibed covers." Irish newspaper Kerryman wrote that the singer "returns with the deceptive tune that was aired by American group Bread. While it may not be a brilliant return the Boy needs our support. Lets hope this will mark the beginning of a full rehabilitation." A reviewer from People Magazine described it as an "atrocious" reggae version, and added, "To fit the reggae meter George must resort to a sort of hiccup on the chorus, “I would give everything I o-own." Oh-oh, Boy!" British newspaper Reading Evening Post reviewed the song as a "croaky and tired sounding version of the old hit."

Charts

Weekly charts

Year-end charts

Covers (details)

Andy Williams released a version in 1972 on his album, Love Theme from "The Godfather".

Cilla Black released a version in 1974 on her album In My Life.

Joe Stampley released this song twice.  First on his 1972 album, If You Touch Me (You've Got to Love Me), and then again in 1976 on his All These Things album.  He released it as a single in 1976 and it peaked at No. 12 on the Country charts.

Brazilian singer Diana recorded a Portuguese version of the song with the title "Tudo Que Eu Tenho". The version by Ken Boothe reached No. 1 on the UK Singles Chart for three weeks in October 1974. The version by Boy George also reached No. 1 on the UK Singles Chart, in 1987.

Country star Crystal Gayle released her version as a single in 1983 where it peaked at No. 93 on the UK Singles Chart.

A cover version of this song was recorded by The Remingtons, a band which comprised former Bread member Jimmy Griffin, on their 1993 album Aim for the Heart.

In 1998, 'N Sync also covered the song on their debut album *NSYNC.

In 2006, Chrissie Hynde covered the song for the soundtrack to the film Happy Feet. This recording was produced by John Powell and Gavin Greenaway. On the soundtrack album Happy Feet: Music from the Motion Picture, the song is mashed up with "The Joker", recorded by Jason Mraz.

The song (in a new ska arrangement) is also included in the 2009 film Bandslam. It is performed by Vanessa Hudgens, and is present on the soundtrack as well.

On November 19, 2009, Greg London and "Everything I Own" won the award for Best Adult Contemporary Song for the highest charting new artist release and release on an independent label on all three AC Radio airplay charts at the Hollywood Music in Media Awards HMMA.

In 2013, Irish group Boyzone released the song as part of their anniversary album BZ20. They later performed the song at Sport Relief 2014.

References

1972 singles
1974 singles
Songs written by David Gates
Bread (band) songs
1987 debut singles
1987 singles
1993 singles
Boy George songs
Rod Stewart songs
Crystal Gayle songs
The Kendalls songs
Andy Williams songs
European Hot 100 Singles number-one singles
Commemoration songs
UK Singles Chart number-one singles
Irish Singles Chart number-one singles
Number-one singles in Norway
Number-one singles in Zimbabwe
1972 songs
Ken Boothe songs
Elektra Records singles
Federal Records singles
Trojan Records singles
Virgin Records singles
Songs about fathers